Thạnh Trị is a district (huyện) of Sóc Trăng province in the Mekong River Delta region of Vietnam. As of 2003 the district had a population of 86,262. The district covers an area of 281 km². The district capital lies at Phú Lộc.

References

Districts of Sóc Trăng province